George Frederick "Jeff" Cooper (Hamilton, Ontario, Canada, c.1936 - March 24, 2018) was a Canadian actor who participated in projects of diverse genres in both film and television.

Early life
George Frederick Cooper was born in Hamilton, Ontario. He first auditioned for film roles but as he was not having any success he decided to go for the realtor business. Coincidentally, the day he received his license was the same day he was cast as Dr. Simon Ellby in the hit T.V. soap opera show Dallas. Cooper played the role from 1979 to 1981.

Career
Besides his famous role as Dr. Ellby he was also cast in various iconic roles. In Mexico, he was perhaps best known as the superhero Kalimán in the famous international production of Kalimán, el hombre increíble (Kalimán, the incredible man) and its sequel Kalimán en el siniestro mundo de Humanón (Kalimán in the sinister world of Humanón.)

Another iconic role of his is the character of Cord in the Bruce Lee written film Circle of Iron.

Filmography

Death
Cooper died on March 24, 2018, in his hometown of Hamilton, at the age of 82.

References

External links 

1930s births
2018 deaths
Canadian male film actors
Canadian male stage actors
Canadian male television actors
Canadian male soap opera actors
Year of birth uncertain
20th-century Canadian male actors
Canadian emigrants to the United States